Truvelo Armoury is a South African firearms manufacturer. It is a division of Truvelo Specialised Manufacturing (Pty) Ltd. Based in Midrand (Johannesburg) the company produces a range of rifles and other small arms for military, law enforcement and civilian users.

Products
Anti Material Rifles
Sniper Rifles
Assault Rifles
Rifle Accessories
Hunting Rifles
Rifle Actions & Barrels
Submachine guns

Sniper Rifles
Truvelo Sniper rifles are a family of bolt-action sniper rifles manufactured in South Africa in calibers ranging from 7.62×51mm NATO to 20×110mm. Models include:
Sniper rifles
7.62×51mm NATO 
.338 Lapua Magnum
12.7×99mm NATO
14.5×114mm
Anti-materiel rifles
20×42mm
20×82mm
20×110mm

Libyan civil war controversy
Discovery of Truvelo sniper rifles in Libya during the 2011 Libyan civil war caused considerable controversy, in parliament and in the press with various government officials making contradictory statements about the matter. The international NGO, Human Rights Watch discovered documents proving the sale in Tripoli; 120 CMS  7.62×51 rifles were delivered in late 2010

External links
Official website

References

Defence companies of South Africa
Manufacturing companies based in Johannesburg
Johannesburg Region A
South African companies established in 1994